Rose Mountain may refer to:

Rose Mountain, List of mountains in Granite County, Montana
Rose Mountain, List of mountains in the Golan Heights
Rose Mountain (Herkimer County, New York)
Rose Mountain (New York)
Rose Mountain (1,730 ft or 530 m), Lyndeborough, New Hampshire
Rose Mountain, fictional mountain on which grows The Bitter Rose in Eternia
Rose Mountain (album), an album by Screaming Females

See also
 Mount Rose (disambiguation)
 Rose Peak (disambiguation)